Moses Judah ben Meir Abbas (–1671), also known by the acronym Mashya, was a 17th-century Talmudist and Hebrew poet.

Abbas was born in Salonika (back then part of the Ottoman Empire) into a prominent Sephardi literary family. He later settled in Egypt, where he founded a 
yeshiva and Talmud Torah, and, in the last years of his life, served as a rabbi in Rosetta. He left a commentary entitled Kisse kavod on the minor tractates Kallah, Soferim, and Semaḥot, and several responsa, which exist in manuscript form in the Bodleian collection.

References
 

Date of birth unknown
1671 deaths
17th-century poets from the Ottoman Empire
17th-century Egyptian people
17th-century Sephardi Jews
17th-century rabbis from the Ottoman Empire
Rabbis from Thessaloniki
Egyptian Sephardi Jews
Hebrew-language poets
Authors of works on the Talmud